Chwele is a town in Bungoma County, Kenya. The town is an agricultural marketing centre located between Kimilili and Bungoma. The market is the major meeting point for farmers from the surrounding areas of Mount Elgon, Namwela, Sirisia, Lurende, Matibo and Chebukaka especially every Monday when there is a market day (flea market). Large quantities of maize, bananas, local vegetables, sim sim as well as livestock such as chicken, goats, cattle and sheep are available for sale.  The market is Kenya's second largest open air market.

The area is inhabited by the Bukusu people and there is a growing populations of Saboats, Tesos and even Kikuyus.  Schools in the area include Chwele Girls High school, Namwela Secondary school, Busakala High school, Teremi High school among others. The area has a health center that caters for the local community and it has both in-patient and out-patient facilities. It nowadays boosts of a medical training institute (Chwele MTC) located at the Junction of Khachonge/Bukembe Road. The center is also home to the Chwele coffee cooperative society and the Chwele grain marketing cereals bank initiated by SACRED Africa, a local NGO operating in the area.

The area has rich black volcanic soils that are suitable for growing many crops with very good yields. The area also receives over 1500mm of rain in a year mostly between the months of March and August.

External links 
 SACRED Africa, NGO 
 Chwele Health Clinic
https://kmtc.ac.ke/chwele/

References 

Populated places in Bungoma County